Tutari is a patriotic poem in the Marathi language by Keshavsut. 

In this poem, Keshavsut calls to fight for independence from the British Raj in India. The poem inspired many Indians to fight to overthrow the British occupation.  The poem reads (translation):

Tutari (Trumpet)

Bring me a trumpet

I shall fill it with my own breath

I shall pierce all skies

With its long ringing notes

एक तुतारी द्या मज आणुनी

फुंकीन जी मी स्वप्राणाने

भेदुनी टाकीन सारी गगने

दीर्घ तिच्या त्या किंकाळीने,

Bring me such a trumpet

Leave the old, let it die

Burn or bury it

Listen with attention to the next Call

अशी तुतारी द्या मजलागुनि

जुने जाऊ द्या मरणालागुनि

जाळूनी किंवा पुरुनी टाका

सडत न एका ठायी ठाका

सावध ऐका पुढल्या हाका

Let us walk shoulder to shoulder

Bring me a trumpet

The status quo is a large boulder

Dig a beautiful cave through it

खांद्यास चला खांदा भिडवूनी

एक तुतारी द्या मज आणुनी

प्राप्तकाल हा विशाल भूधर

सुंदर लेणी तयात खोदा

Inscribe your own names on it

Why just sit around and grow fat

Get up and accomplish some brave feat

निजनामे त्या वरती नोंदा

बसुनी का वाढविता मेदा

विक्रम काही करा चला तर

Attack the fort of hypocrisy

Come Oh Braves, make haste

Raise high the flag of Equality

Wave the proclamation of Moral Ideals

Synchronized with these notes of the trumpet.

हल्ला करण्या ह्या दंभावर,ह्या बंडावर

शुरांनो या त्वरा करा रे

समते चा ध्वज उंच धारा रे

नीती ची द्वाही फिरवा रे

तुतारीच्या या सुरा बरोबर

References

Marathi-language literature
Indian poems